Georgette W. Valle ( Vikingstad; October 31, 1924) is an American former politician in the state of Washington. Valle served in the Washington House of Representatives as a Democrat from the 31st District, as well as the 34th District.

Biography
As a Democratic Party member, Valle worked on local campaigns and served as Legislative Chairwoman for the Highline chapter of the National Organization of Women. She later became Legislative Chairwoman of the Democratic Party's 1969 Task Force and acted as a catalyst for bringing environmentalists in touch with the Democratic Caucus. She is an alumna of the University of Minnesota graduating with a degree in occupational therapy and has worked as an occupational therapist. She was married to Odd Valle, originally from Norway, who was a dentist.

References

External links 
 Georgette Valle at ourcampaigns.com
 Odd & Georgette Valle at highlinehistory.org

1924 births
Living people
21st-century American women
Women state legislators in Washington (state)
Democratic Party members of the Washington House of Representatives
People from Blue Earth, Minnesota
University of Minnesota alumni
Occupational therapists
Writers from Minnesota
Writers from Washington (state)